Jaroslav Hynek (born 5 September 1975) is a Czech football manager and a former football player. Currectly manager of MŠK Žilina.

Playing career
Hynek played in the Czech Second League for Přerov, leaving the club at the age of 24.

Managerial career
Hynek took over from Jaroslav Šilhavý as manager of Czech First League side FK Dukla Prague in September 2016, following Šilhavý's departure to Slavia Prague.  Having guided Dukla to a 7th-placed finish in the 2016–17 season, Hynek signed a new two-year contract with the club in May 2017. Hynek's second season at Dukla was less successful, with the club losing 16 matches and finishing just two points from the relegation places. This led to the backroom staff, including Hynek, being dismissed in June 2018.

References

External links
 Manager Profile at idnes.cz 

1975 births
People from Šternberk
Living people
Czech footballers
Czechoslovak footballers
Czech football managers
Czech First League managers
Association footballers not categorized by position
Sportspeople from the Olomouc Region
FK Dukla Prague managers
MŠK Žilina managers
Expatriate football managers in Slovakia
Czech expatriate sportspeople in Slovakia
Czech National Football League players